Álex Sola López-Ocaña (born 9 June 1999), sometimes known as Álex Ujía, is a Spanish professional footballer who plays for Real Sociedad as a right back.

Club career
Sola was born in San Sebastián, Gipuzkoa, Basque Country, and represented Real Sociedad as a youth. He made his senior debut with the reserves on 9 April 2017, starting in a 0–0 Segunda División B home draw against Sestao River Club.

Sola was definitely promoted to the B-team ahead of the 2017–18 campaign, and appeared regularly afterwards. He made his first team – and La Liga – debut on 16 February 2019, playing the full 90 minutes in a 3–0 home defeat of CD Leganés.

On 14 August 2019, Sola renewed his contract with the Txuri-urdin until 2023, and was immediately loaned to Segunda División side CD Numancia for one year. He scored his first professional goal the following 22 February, netting the opener in a 2–1 loss at Albacete Balompié.

Sola suffered a knee injury in July 2020, returning to the following April before being again sidelined in August. He returned to action in January 2022, subsequently becoming a regular starter for Sanse before renewing his contract until 2026 on 12 May.

On 2 August 2022, Sola was definitely promoted to Real Sociedad's first team, being assigned the number 2 jersey.

References

External links
Profile at the Real Sociedad website

1999 births
Living people
Footballers from San Sebastián
Spanish footballers
Association football defenders
La Liga players
Segunda División players
Segunda División B players
Real Sociedad B footballers
Real Sociedad footballers
CD Numancia players
Spain youth international footballers